NGC 5114 is a lenticular galaxy located about 170 million light-years away in the constellation Centaurus. The galaxy was discovered by astronomer John Herschel on June 3, 1836.

See also
 List of NGC objects (5001–6000)

References

External links
 

Centaurus (constellation)
Lenticular galaxies
5114
46828
Astronomical objects discovered in 1836
Discoveries by John Herschel